The 1943 Green Bay Packers season was their 25th overall and their 23rd season in the National Football League. The team finished with a 7–2–1 record under coach Curly Lambeau, earning a second-place finish in the Western Conference.

Offseason

NFL draft

 Yellow indicates a future Pro Bowl selection

Regular season

Schedule

Game summaries

Week 1

Standings

Roster

Awards, records, and honors

References

 Sportsencyclopedia.com

Green Bay Packers seasons
Green Bay Packers
Green